Freddie Fisher (11 June 1904 – 28 March 1967) was an American musician, leader of a band variously known simply as the Freddie Fisher Band, Freddie Fisher and His Schnickelfritz Orchestra (The word schnickelfritz is an affectionate term of German origin for "a mischievous little boy"; comparable to scamp.), or Colonel Corn and His Band.  The band, which first made its name in Minnesota, was essentially a novelty act, influenced by such vaudeville performers as Clayton, Jackson, and Durante. His deliberately corny approach to songs was a precursor to Spike Jones.

Hits in Billboard'''s early (pre-1944) country music charts include "Horsey, Keep Your Tail Up", "Sugar Loaf Waltz" and "They Go Wild, Simply Wild Over Me".

Fisher was born in 1904 in Lourdes, Iowa (near Garnavillo, Iowa) and died in 1967 in Aspen, Colorado. He appeared in at least nine films between 1938 and 1949.At least one source says he appeared in 15 films, but does not list them: Mary Eshbaugh Hayes, Freddie Fisher , The Aspen Times, 3 July 2005. Retrieved 14 August 2011. The latter part of his life was lived in Aspen, where he ran a repair shop called Fisher the Fixer and played in a band that included his son King Fisher.

"Cornstars: Rube Music in Swing Time", a biography from author/filmmaker Jack Norton, has been an Amazon best-seller  and earned the prestigious Certificate of Merit for “Best Historical Research in Recorded Popular Music” from the Association for Recorded Sound Collections.

Films
Turkey in the Straw (1941), a soundie

Notes

Further reading
 Su Lum & Barbara A. Lewis, Fisher the Fixer (Second Edition, 1974), self-published. Lum is a longtime columnist for the Aspen Times.

External links
 
 Fan site, including link to authorized online copy of Fisher the Fixer''.

1904 births
1967 deaths
American bandleaders
American comedy musicians
American parodists
Parody musicians
20th-century American musicians
Comedians from Iowa
20th-century American comedians